Dean Green is a hamlet which partly makes up the civil parish of Nether Alderley in the unitary authority of Cheshire East and the ceremonial county of Cheshire, England.

Hamlets in Cheshire